Molly Leishman is a New Zealand actress, known for her regular appearances from 2013–2014 as Isabella Kingston in New Zealand comedy-drama television series Agent Anna , for her lead role in three seasons of TVNZ's The Cul De Sac and Wilde Ride  and for playing Caligula's sister Livilla in Roman Empire in 2019. She also guest starred as Kerry in Power Rangers Beast Morphers and Sienna inShortland Street

Early life

Molly Leishman was born on March 1, 1998   in Auckland, New Zealand and is the daughter of television and radio broadcaster Mark Leishman (father) and Jo Raymond (mother). Leishman began her education at the Diocesan School for Girls, Auckland,  before attending the ACG Senior College in Auckland. Leishman went on to study for a Bachelor's degree in Design for Social Innovation (DSI) at Victoria University of Wellington.

Acting career

Leishman was aged 11 when she had her debut television appearance in a cornflakes advert. In 2010, she starred as a child actress in a lead role in the Michael Keusch directed television film  Forever New Zealand  as Lissy, and has made appearances in Agent Anna  as Anna's daughter Isabella Kingston,  and in TVNZ's television family drama, Wilde Ride in 2017.
Leishman starred as Eliza in  The Cul De Sac (TV series)  which was awarded ‘Regional Winner (Australia & New Zealand) Best Children's Programme’ at the 2019 Asian Academy Creative Awards. In 2019, Leishman starred as Livilla (Caligula’s sister) in Series 3 “Caligula: The Mad Emperor” of the television documentary series, Roman Empire.

Filmography

Television

References

External links 
 
Instagram – Molly Leishman
facebook – Molly Leishman
Celebrity Pet Day – Molly Leishman

Living people
1998 births
21st-century New Zealand actresses
New Zealand television actresses
People from Auckland
Victoria University of Wellington alumni